Pedro Ascencio Alquisiras    is one of the 81 municipalities of Guerrero in south-western Mexico. The municipal seat lies at Ixcapuzalco.

In 2005, the municipality had a total population of 6,987.

References

Municipalities of Guerrero